The Lyric Symphony, Op. 18, was composed by Alexander von Zemlinsky between 1922 and 1923 and received its premiere in Prague on June 4, 1924, under the composer's direction.

The work is in seven connected movements and is scored for baritone and soprano soloists and a large orchestra. The sung texts are taken from The Gardener by Rabindranath Tagore in a German translation by Hans Effenberger.

The movements are:
  ("I am restless. I am athirst for far-away things")
  ("O mother, the young Prince")
  ("You are the evening cloud")
  ("Speak to me, my love")
  ("Release me from the bonds of your sweetness, Love")
  ("Then finish the last song")
  ("Peace, my heart")

Alban Berg quoted the third movement in his Lyric Suite for string quartet.

Instrumentation

Woodwinds
4 flutes (3rd and 4th doubling piccolos)
3 oboes (3rd doubling cor anglais)
3 A clarinets (3rd doubling E-flat clarinet)
bass clarinet
3 bassoons (3rd doubling contrabassoon)

Brass
4 horns
3 C trumpets
3 trombones
bass tuba

Percussion
timpani
bass drum
side drum
tam-tam
cymbals
tambourine
triangle
Xylophone

Keyboards
harmonium
celesta

Voices
soprano solo
baritone solo

Strings
harp

1st violins
2nd violins
violas
cellos
double basses

References
Text of the symphony
Text of the symphony with translations
Program notes to American Symphony Orchestra concert

Compositions by Alexander von Zemlinsky
Zemlinsky Lyric
Adaptations of works by Rabindranath Tagore
1922 compositions